Yuen Long Catholic Secondary School , which was established in 1995 by Catholic Diocese of Hong Kong, is a subsidized co-educational school located in Hong Kong. Being a vocational school since 1995, it was changed into a grammar school in 2002. It held 22 classes in 2007–2008.

References 

Secondary schools in Hong Kong
Catholic secondary schools in Hong Kong
Yuen Long